Sir Michael Boyd HonFRSE (born 6 July 1955) is a British theatre director, and a former artistic director of the Royal Shakespeare Company.

Early years
Boyd was born in Belfast, Northern Ireland, and educated at Latymer Upper School in London, Daniel Stewart's College, Edinburgh, and at the University of Edinburgh where he gained an M.A. in English Literature and performed with the Edinburgh University Drama Society.

Career
Boyd trained as a director at the Malaya Bronnaya Theatre in Moscow, and in 1979 took up his first post as a trainee director at the Belgrade Theatre in Coventry, graduating to Assistant Director a year later.

In 1982, he joined the Sheffield Crucible as an Associate Director, and three years later became founding Artistic Director of the Tron Theatre in Glasgow, where he staged a production of Macbeth starring Iain Glen, an adaptation of Janice Galloway’s The Trick is to Keep Breathing and Michel Tremblay’s Quebec plays, The Real World? and The Guid Sisters.

Boyd joined the RSC in 1996 as an Associate Director, staging the three parts of Henry VI together with Richard III at the Young Vic in London in April 2002, as part of the This England: Histories Cycle.

During this time he was also Drama Director of the New Beginnings Festival of Soviet Arts in Glasgow in 1999, and directed Miss Julie in the Frank McGuinness version at the Theatre Royal Haymarket in February 2000.

Taking over from Adrian Noble in 2003, Boyd assumed control of the RSC, burdened with a deficit of £2.8m, with a remit to turn its fortunes around. He ran a year-long Complete Works of Shakespeare Festival (begun in April 2006 and involving other companies as well as the RSC) and a London season at the Novello Theatre.

In 2007, he launched the long-awaited redevelopment of the Royal Shakespeare Theatre. This included construction of the temporary Courtyard Theatre to provide a Stratford venue while work was in progress. It was designed to house The Histories cycle, before its transfer to the Roundhouse in London in 2008.

Boyd has regularly collaborated with stage designer Tom Piper since they first worked together on a pantomime for the Tron Theatre in Glasgow.

Private life and honours
Boyd was knighted in the 2012 Birthday Honours for services to drama and was elected an Honorary Fellow of the Royal Society of Edinburgh in March 2016.

References

Further reading
Trowbridge, Simon: The Company: A Biographical Dictionary of the Royal Shakespeare Company, Oxford: Editions Albert Creed (2010)

External links
The Company: A Biographical Dictionary of the RSC: Supplementary Material by Simon Trowbridge
Shakespeare Birthplace Trust: Theatre Profile
The British Theatre Guide: Directors Pages
theatreVOICE: critic Heather Neill talks to Michael Boyd about the Shakespeare History Cycle, 25 April 2007
London Theatre profile

1955 births
Living people
Alumni of the University of Edinburgh
British theatre directors
Fellows of St Catherine's College, Oxford
Honorary Fellows of the Royal Society of Edinburgh
Irish theatre directors
Knights Bachelor
Laurence Olivier Award winners
People educated at Stewart's Melville College